Aleksander Zborowski (Jastrzebiec coat of arms) was a Polish szlachcic (nobleman), the Starosta of Miedzyrzecz, who commanded a unit of the Polish army during the Polish–Muscovite War (1605–18). Little is known about his life: he was the son of Samuel Zborowski and Zofia née Jordan.

In May 1610 he defeated German mercenaries in Russian service, and during the Battle of Klushino, he commanded his own regiment. In September 1610, Zborowski defeated Russian-German forces near Tver.

Zborowski married Magdalena Fredro, and had three children: daughters Anna and Konstancja, and son Adam, who became a Jesuit. He died in 1637.

Sources 
 Leszek Podhorodecki, Stanislaw Zolkiewski, Ludowa Spóldzielnia Wydawnicza, 1988, 

1637 deaths
16th-century Polish nobility
Polish people of the Polish–Muscovite War (1605–1618)
Military personnel of the Polish–Lithuanian Commonwealth
Year of birth missing
17th-century Polish nobility
17th-century Polish military personnel